A water resource basin is the third-level subdivision of the United States hydrologic unit system. Water resource basins were formerly called water resource accounting units. There are currently 370 water resource basins in the system. Water resource basins are further subdivided into water resource subbasins. Water resource basins have a 6-digit Hydrologic Unit Code (HUC).

References 

Lists of drainage basins
Drainage basins
Watersheds of the United States
Regions of the United States
 Resource
Water resource basins
United States hydrologic unit system